Ella Jay Basco (born September 17, 2006) is an American actress, singer and songwriter best known for her work in Birds of Prey (2020). In 2020, she released her EP, Middle School. In February 2022, she released her single Eye to Eye for her upcoming album.

Early life
Basco was born in Los Angeles and is of Filipino and Korean ancestry. She is the second of four children. She is the niece of actors Dion and Dante Basco.

Career
Basco started her career when she was six months old with a  print advertisement for Old Navy. After making numerous commercials and television appearances, Ella Jay Basco landed her first film role in the 2020 film Birds of Prey as Cassandra Cain. Basco released her first EP named Middle School, it includes the song The Ballad of Cassandra Cain.  In 2022, she released songs such as Eye to Eye and Bubble Tea

Filmography

Film

Television

Discography

Accolades

References

External links
 

2006 births
21st-century American actresses
Actresses from Los Angeles
American actresses of Filipino descent
American actresses of Korean descent
American child actresses
Living people